Fazeli may refer to:

 Fazeli, Iran, a village in Fars Province
 Reza Fazeli, Iranian actor
 Reza Fazeli (agent), Iranian football agent
 Hossein Martin Fazeli, Iranian Canadian film director